Popped in Souled Out is the debut studio album by Scottish band Wet Wet Wet. It was released on 21 September 1987. Its offspring singles were "Wishing I Was Lucky", "Sweet Little Mystery", "Angel Eyes (Home and Away)" and "Temptation". Upon release, it reached number two on the UK Albums Chart, held off top spot by Michael Jackson's Bad. It reached number one on 16 January 1988. A 5-CD 30th Anniversary Edition was released on 22 September 2017.

The vinyl issue of the album only contained the first 9 tracks.

Track listing

Credits and personnel
Vocals by Wet Wet Wet and Graeme Duffin.
Marti Pellow – Vocals
Graeme Clark – Bass
Neil Mitchell – Synthesizers
Tommy Cunningham – Drums 
Graeme Duffin – Guitar

Charts

Certifications

References

1987 debut albums
Wet Wet Wet albums
Uni Records albums